Maša Vesenjak (born 12 September 1982) is a Slovenian former female tennis player.

She has won two doubles titles on the ITF tour. On 30 July 2001, she reached her best singles ranking of world number 375. On 18 December 2000, she peaked at world number 295 in the doubles rankings.

Vesenjak made her WTA tour debut at the 2001 Morocco Open.

Her twin, Urška Vesenjak, is also a former female tennis player.

ITF finals (2-9)

Singles (0–3)

Doubles (2–6)

References

External links 
 
 

1982 births
Living people
Sportspeople from Maribor
Slovenian female tennis players